Spilomyia foxleei is a species of syrphid fly in the family Syrphidae.

Distribution
Canada: British Columbia, United States:California, Oregon, Washington

References

Further reading
* 

Eristalinae
Insects described in 1958
Diptera of North America
Hoverflies of North America